Saint-Georges is a station on Line 12 of the Paris Métro in the 9th arrondissement.

The station opened on 8 April 1911 as part of the extension of the Nord-Sud company's line A from Notre-Dame-de-Lorette to Pigalle. On 27 March 1931 line A became line 12 of the Métro. The station is named after the Rue Saint-Georges, which became a street in 1734 and leads to the Place Saint-Georges, created in 1824.  It was the centre of an estate created by the speculator Dosne, father-in-law of the politician Adolphe Thiers.

It was renovated during the early 2000s in imitation of the style adopted by the Nord-Sud Company, the original architects of the station. In fact, the current decorative style only vaguely resembles the original: the station name is no longer shown on large ceramic tablets (as at Solférino and Abbesses) and does not follow the original colour-coding: the edge of the ceramic name tablets should be brown to designate a non-interchange station, rather than green.

Station layout

References
Roland, Gérard (2003). Stations de métro. D’Abbesses à Wagram. Éditions Bonneton.

Paris Métro stations in the 9th arrondissement of Paris
Railway stations in France opened in 1911